The Laville PS-89, also known as the ZIG-1, was an airliner produced in small numbers in the Soviet Union in the 1930s. Design work commenced in 1933 to provide Aeroflot with an airliner of contemporary design, to replace the obsolete Tupolev ANT-9s and Kalinin K-5s then in service. Designed by French engineer André Laville, it was a low-wing cantilever monoplane of conventional design, with twin engines in wing-mounted nacelles, and retractable tailwheel undercarriage. Construction was of metal throughout, except for the fabric skinning of the control surfaces. Laville left the project before the prototype was built, and A.V. Kulev replaced him to lead the project.

The prototype first flew in Spring 1935, but on 27 November, it crashed when the horizontal stabilizer failed during a landing approach. Kulev and five others were killed. The crash was attributed to a flaw in the workmanship, not in the design, and work continued on the project under the leadership of P.I. Eberzin.

A second prototype flew in spring 1937, and a small series of six machines followed from 1937 to 1938. All seven were soon put to use on the Moscow–Simferopol route, where they served until the outbreak of the German-Soviet War. Between 29 September and 11 October 1938 S. Fokanov and S. Andreev flew a PS-89 over the capital cities of all eleven republics of the Soviet Union, covering  in 44 hours and 40 minutes.

Operators

Aeroflot

Specifications (variant)

See also

Notes

References
 

 
 

1930s Soviet airliners